Anopinella tucki is a species of moth of the family Tortricidae. It is found in Peru.

The length of the forewings is about 10 mm across.

External links
Systematic revision of Anopinella Powell (Lepidoptera: Tortricidae: Euliini) and phylogenetic analysis of the Apolychrosis group of genera

Anopinella
Moths described in 2003
Moths of South America